Colin Bryan Riordan  (born 27 July 1959 in Paderborn, Germany) is a British academic who has been President and Vice-Chancellor at Cardiff University since 1 September 2012.

Education

Riordan obtained his PhD from the University of Manchester in 1986.

Career

Riordan taught English as a foreign language at Julius-Maximilians-Universitat Wurzburg in Germany (1982–84). He was Lecturer, then Senior Lecturer in German at Swansea University from 1986 to 1998.

He became Professor of German at Newcastle University in 1998, later being appointed Pro Vice-Chancellor and Provost of the Faculty of Humanities and Social Sciences in August 2005.

In October 2007, he took up the post of Vice-Chancellor at the University of Essex. On 1 September 2012, he became Vice-Chancellor of Cardiff University.

In 2015, under his purview as Vice-Chancellor, Riordan announced that Cardiff University would launch five new flagship research centres, each focusing on a world issue. These include resolving chronic diseases; the scarcity of water; the prevention of crime; studying big data; and creating smarter energy systems.

Riordan was appointed Commander of the Order of the British Empire (CBE) in the 2023 New Year Honours for services to higher education.

Research and publications

He has published on post-war German literature and culture, including editing books on the writers Jurek Becker, Uwe Johnson and Peter Schneider.

Personal life

In November 2017, shortly after missing Bisexual Visibility Day, Riordan came out as bisexual in a monthly email to staff. The BBC quoted him as saying, "Only a few vice chancellors have spoken out about being gay or lesbian and none about being bi, as far as I'm aware." He has two daughters from a former marriage.

Memberships

 Vice-president and board member of Universities UK
 Board member of the Leadership Foundation for Higher Education
 Trustee, the Edge Foundation
 Member of UK NARIC Advisory Council
 Member of UCAS board of trustees
 Board member of the Equality Challenge Unit
 Chair, Universities UK International (UUKi)
 Member of the International Education Council sponsored by the Department of Business, Innovation and Skills
 Chair of the International Policy Network of Universities UK

In 2013 he became chair of Higher Education Wales, the body which represents the interests of Higher Education Institutions in Wales.

References

Living people
1959 births
Linguists from the United Kingdom
Alumni of the University of Manchester
Academics of Cardiff University
Academics of Swansea University
Academics of Newcastle University
Academics of the University of Essex
Bisexual men
People from Cardiff
Commanders of the Order of the British Empire